Nathan Widder is an American-born political philosopher whose work engages with the history of Western political thought and philosophy, contemporary Continental philosophy, and feminist political theory.

He has done research and published widely on questions of difference, pluralism, power, identity, and knowledge, and he has drawn on ideas in contemporary thought in order to stage a re-engagement with both central and marginal figures in ancient, early Christian, and medieval philosophy.  He received his Ph.D. from Essex University under the supervision of celebrated political theorists Ernesto Laclau and Sue Golding.  He also has an MSc (Econ) Political Theory from The London School of Economics, and a BA Political Science from Johns Hopkins University, where he was a student of William E. Connolly.

Widder is Professor of Political Theory at Royal Holloway, University of London, where he was Head of the Politics and International Relations department (2009-2013).

Widder has published articles in prominent journals, including Angelaki, Continental Philosophy Review, Contemporary Political Theory, European Journal of Political Theory, History of Political Thought, Parallax, Philosophy and Social Criticism, Philosophy Today, Political Theory, and Theory & Event. His article 'Foucault and Power Revisited' is consistently one of the most widely-read on the topic.

He has also produced three major studies, Genealogies of Difference (University of Illinois Press, 2002), Reflections on Time and Politics (Penn State University Press, 2008), and Political Theory after Deleuze (Continuum Press, 2012).

References

External links
Nathan Widder, Royal Holloway, University of London
Genealogies of Difference (University of Illinois Press, 2002)
Reflections on Time and Politics (Penn State University Press, 2008)
Political Theory after Deleuze (Continuum, 2012)
List of Selected Publications

Living people
American philosophers
Academics of Royal Holloway, University of London
Johns Hopkins University alumni
Year of birth missing (living people)